Leart Shukri Paqarada (born 8 October 1994) is a professional footballer who plays as a left-back for German club FC St. Pauli. Internationally, he has represented Germany and Albania at the youth level, before finally switching his international allegiance to Kosovo at the senior level.

Club career

Early career
Paqarada joined local club Werder Bremen at the age of four. After five years, he moved to Bayer Leverkusen, where he played at all youth levels. In November 2012, Paqarada was promoted to the club's reserve team, Bayer Leverkusen II.  His debut with reserve team came on 17 November in a 3–2 away win against VfB Hüls after coming on as a substitute in the 89th minute in place of Tobias Steffen.

SV Sandhausen

In the summer of 2014, Paqarada joined 2. Bundesliga side SV Sandhausen. On 3 August 2014, he was named as a Sandhausen substitute for the first time in a league match against Darmstadt 98. His debut with Sandhausen came seven days later in a 1–1 home draw against 1. FC Kaiserslautern after being named in the starting line-up.

FC St. Pauli
On 2 August 2020, Paqarada signed a three-year contract with 2. Bundesliga rivals FC St. Pauli, joining on a free transfer. On 13 September 2020, he made his debut with St. Pauli in the 2020–21 DFB-Pokal first round against SV Elversberg after being named in the starting line-up and assists in his side's first goal during a 4–2 away defeat. He established himself as a regular in the club's line-up and served as its captain during the 2022–23 season.

1. FC Köln
On 23 January 2023, Paqarada signed a three-year precontract with Bundesliga club 1. FC Köln and this transfer would become legally effective in June 2023.

International career

Youth with Germany and Albania
From 2009, until 2011, Paqarada represented Germany at youth international level, making 13 appearances for the U16 and U17 teams. In February 2013, he became part of Albania U21 side with which he made his debut in a 0–0 home draw against Macedonia U21 after being named in the starting line-up.

Kosovo

First period
On 4 September 2014, Paqarada received a call-up from Kosovo for the friendly match against Oman, and made his debut after being named in the starting line-up. His last international match was on 24 March 2021 against Lithuania in Pristina. On 4 April 2021, Paqarada through an Instagram post announced his temporary international retirement due to the degradation, disrespect and ignorance that according to him was done by Kosovo's head coach Bernard Challandes and the possible return to the national team would occur if a new head coach is appointed.

Second period
On 16 September 2022, Paqarada upon return from retirement received a call-up from Kosovo for the 2022–23 UEFA Nations League matches against Northern Ireland and Cyprus, but due to injury, could not be part of the national team.

Personal life
Born in Aachen, Germany, Paqarada is the son of Shukri Paqarada, a former professional footballer who played as a goalkeeper for Prishtina.

Career statistics

Club

International

Scores and results list Kosovo's goal tally first, score column indicates score after each Paqarada goal.

References

External links

1994 births
Living people
Sportspeople from Aachen
Footballers from North Rhine-Westphalia
Kosovan footballers
Kosovo international footballers
Albanian footballers
Albania youth international footballers
German footballers
Germany youth international footballers
German people of Kosovan descent
German people of Albanian descent
Association football fullbacks
Bayer 04 Leverkusen II players
2. Bundesliga players
SV Sandhausen players
FC St. Pauli players